Idhayam Pesugirathu is a 1981 Indian Tamil-language film written and directed by S. A. Chandrasekhar, starring Raveendran and Ambika. It was released on 5 February 1982.

Plot

Cast 
Raveendran
Ambika

Soundtrack 
The music was composed by Shyam.

References

External links 

1980s Tamil-language films
1982 films
Films directed by S. A. Chandrasekhar
Films scored by Shyam (composer)